Fjelsø is a village in Himmerland, Denmark, with a population of 202 (1 January 2022), situated in Fjelsø parish. The village belongs to Vesthimmerland Municipality and is located in the North Denmark Region.

Fjelsø has a lake in the middle of the village. Near the village lies Steensbækgaard, where former mayor of Aalestrup Municipality and former folketing member Per Bisgaard was born and raised.

Fjelsø has its own school and Fjelsø church. Before it was in Vesthimmerland Municipality, it was part of Aalestrup Municipality.

Notable people 
 Per Bisgaard (born 1955 in Fjelsø) a former teacher, mayor of Aalestrup 1994–2001, and member of the Folketinget

References

Towns and settlements in Vesthimmerland Municipality
Cities and towns in the North Jutland Region
Vesthimmerland Municipality